Ponnusamy Venugopal was a member of the 15th Lok Sabha of India. He represented the Tiruvallur constituency of Tamil Nadu and is a member of the All India Anna Dravida Munnetra Kazhagam political party.

Tiruvallur constituency is reserved under Scheduled Caste category.

Education & background
Dr. Ponnusamy Venugopal is medical practitioner by education & profession. He has been in active politics and was elected in 2009.

Posts held

See also
List of members of the 15th Lok Sabha of India

References

External links 

India MPs 2009–2014
Lok Sabha members from Tamil Nadu
1952 births
Living people
India MPs 2014–2019
People from Tiruvallur district
All India Anna Dravida Munnetra Kazhagam politicians